Hector Douglas Thomson (20 February 1881 – 9 August 1939) was a New Zealand rugby union player. He was a member of the New Zealand national side, the All Blacks, between 1905 and 1908, appearing in 15 matches including one international. In all, he scored 16 tries and kicked one conversion for the All Blacks. He was the first player to score six tries in a match for New Zealand, against British Columbia in 1906.

Outside of rugby, Thomson was a public servant, rising to become under-secretary for immigration. He died in Wellington on 9 August 1939.

References

1881 births
1939 deaths
Rugby union players from Napier, New Zealand
People educated at Wellington College (New Zealand)
New Zealand rugby union players
New Zealand international rugby union players
Wellington rugby union players
Auckland rugby union players
Canterbury rugby union players
Wanganui rugby union players
Rugby union wings
New Zealand public servants